Acacia derwentiana, known as Derwent cascade, is a shrub belonging to the genus Acacia and the subgenus Juliflorae that is native to Tasmania.

Description
It has slender branchlets that are arching or pendulous at the extremities. Like most species of Acacia it has phyllodes rather than true leaves. The phyllodes are pungent and have three nerves, the middle one being the most prominent. When it blooms it produces simple inflorescences with interrupted cylindrical flower-spikes that have a length of  containing pale yellow to almost lemon yellow coloured flowers. After flowering seed podd form that are linear to curved and irregularly constricted between each seed.

Taxonomy
It is closely related to Acacia riceana but the phyllodes are more elongated.

Distribution
It is endemic to southern parts of Tasmania where it is mostly situated along the banks of the Derwent River and a few of its lower tributaries including the Broad and Tyenna Rivers. It is also found along the Carlton River and Prosser Rivers and their tributaries also to the north and east of Hobart.

See also
List of Acacia species

References

derwentiana
Flora of Tasmania
Plants described in 2005